Herbert Wiedermann (born 1 November 1927) was an Austrian sprint canoeist who competed from the early 1950s to the early 1960s. Competing in three Summer Olympics, he won two bronze medals in the K-2 1000 m event (1952, 1956). Wiedermann also won four medals at the ICF Canoe Sprint World Championships with a gold (K-2 10000 m: 1954) and three bronzes (K-1 4 x 500 m: 1950, 1954; K-2 500 m: 1950).

References

External links
 

1927 births
Possibly living people
Austrian male canoeists
Canoeists at the 1952 Summer Olympics
Canoeists at the 1956 Summer Olympics
Canoeists at the 1960 Summer Olympics
Olympic canoeists of Austria
Olympic bronze medalists for Austria
Olympic medalists in canoeing
ICF Canoe Sprint World Championships medalists in kayak

Medalists at the 1956 Summer Olympics
Medalists at the 1952 Summer Olympics